Wulikare is a small settlement in Jubek State, South Sudan, about 0.5 km south of the Koda River, 4 km west of Ludo Kenyi, 14 km from the Jebel Lado mountain, 37 km southwest of Mongalla, and 29 km from the state capital Juba  It is located near on the road from Juba to Buko, Tijor, and Rokon.

References

Populated places in Jubek State